Coulags  is a small hamlet in Glen Carron in Strathcarron, west Ross-shire,  Scottish Highlands and is in the Scottish council area of Highland.

References

Populated places in Ross and Cromarty